Beverley Hamilton Lyon (19 January 1902 – 22 June 1970) was a cricketer who played for Oxford University and Gloucestershire.  He was a bespectacled middle-order batsman and a fine close fielder who held forthright and, for his time, outspoken views on cricket captaincy and cricket traditions and who was given full rein by his county, Gloucestershire, to express his views as captain for six years from 1929.

Biography
Some of Lyon's views – on Sunday cricket and on a knockout cup, for instance – were by some distance too far ahead of their time. But in 1931, he was involved in a "rule-bending" match against Yorkshire at Sheffield in which, after two rain-ruined days, he and the Yorkshire captain agreed to declare their counties' first innings after one ball had been bowled to bring about a result on the second innings. The rules were changed for the following season to allow for a one-innings match in similar circumstances.

Lyon brought Gloucestershire greater success than the county had seen since the days of W. G. Grace. In 1929 and 1930, they won more matches than any other county; in 1930 and 1931, they finished second. Lyon was aided, no doubt, by having Wally Hammond, perhaps England's finest batsman of the time in the side. And the three years of success coincided as well with the last truly effective years of the great slow left-arm bowler Charlie Parker and the first effective years of Parker's successor, the off break bowler Tom Goddard. But the captaincy of Lyon was regarded as a vital factor, and he was chosen as a Wisden Cricketer of the Year in 1931. The citation in Wisden suggested that he might be a future captain of England, but that did not happen.

Lyon's Gloucestershire career began in 1921; he also won a Blue at Oxford in 1922 and 1923. He resigned from the Gloucestershire captaincy after three more moderate years from 1932 to 1934, but played intermittently until 1947. He had also played Minor Counties cricket for Wiltshire in 1920.

Lyon's older brother, Malcolm Douglas Lyon, known as Dar, played for Cambridge University and Somerset. The brothers were on opposing sides in the 1922 Varsity match. And in 1930, in the match between Somerset and Gloucestershire at Taunton, Dar scored 210 after being dropped twice by Goddard, but Bev replied with a century of his own and led his side to victory by eight wickets.

See also
List of select Jewish cricketers

References

External links
 
"Remembering Bev Lyon, Gloucestershire Cricketer and Co-Founder of Rediffusion Ltd."

1902 births
1970 deaths
English cricketers
Gloucestershire cricketers
Gloucestershire cricket captains
Oxford University cricketers
Wiltshire cricketers
Europeans cricketers
Wisden Cricketers of the Year
People from Caterham
Jewish cricketers
English Jews
West of England cricketers
Marylebone Cricket Club cricketers
Non-international England cricketers
Gentlemen cricketers
Gentlemen of England cricketers
Jewish British sportspeople
People educated at Rugby School
Alumni of The Queen's College, Oxford
English cricketers of 1919 to 1945
People from Balcombe, West Sussex